Madhya Pradesh is a state situated in the central India having an area of around 308000 km2. The state's administration operates through 50 districts, 282 tehsils / Blocks. In order to avail financial and social benefits of Information Technology, the establishment of State Wide Area Network (SWAN) has been envisaged. The SWAN will provide primary backbone for communication of voice, data and video throughout the state and will be an effective tool for implementation of e-Governance Projects.

Scope of SWAN

State Head Quarter (NMC) : 1
Number of Divisions : 10 
Number of Districts : 51
Number of Blocks/Tehsils : 380
Number of POPs:(NMC)=380 .

Project details

Date of commencement  
23 August 2008

Project cost 
Rs. 116.70 Crores DIT, GOI shall be funding
Rs. 57.50 Crores is borne by the Govt of MP.
Total: Rs. 174.21 Crores.

Project overview
Software Technology Parks of India (STPI) was appointed as the consultant for the project.
STPI carried out a study to assess the requirements of MPSWAN and accordingly designed the Network.
State Government Departments, Public enterprises and Organizations in Madhya Pradesh will use SWAN for their e-Governance projects
Through MPSWAN all the Government Departments will be connected
A Total number of 360 PoPs has to be established in CHQ, DHQ & BHQ
M/s Netlink software pvt ltd. is the implementing agency for MPSWAN Project
MPSEDC has been monitoring the preparation of PoP sites
As on date 317 PoPs has been established
99 Horizontal connections has been established as on date.

MP SWAN locations
Alirajpur
Anuppur
Ashoknagar
Balaghat
Barwani
Betul
Bhind
Bhopal
Burhanpur
Chhatarpur
Chhindwara
Damoh
Datia
Dewas
Dhar
Dindori
Guna
Gwalior
Harda
Hoshangabad
Indore
Jabalpur
Jhabua
Katni
Khandwa
Khargone
Mandla
Mandsaur
Morena
Narsinghpur
Neemuch
Panna
Raisen
Rajgarh
Ratlam
Rewa
Sagar
Satna
Sehore
Seoni
Singrauli
Shahdol
Shajapur
Sheopur
Shivpuri
Sidhi
Tikamgarh
Ujjain
Umaria
Vidisha

See also

 State Wide Area Network

References

E-government in India
Government of Madhya Pradesh